Grand Rapids Air Force Station is a closed United States Air Force General Surveillance Radar station. It was closed in 1963.

History
Grand Rapids Air Force Station was initially part of Phase II of the Air Defense Command Mobile Radar program. The Air Force approved this expansion of the Mobile Radar program on October 23, 1952.  Radars in this network were designated “SM.”

The station became operational on 1 July 1956 when the 707th Aircraft Control and Warning Squadron began operating an AN/FPS-3 search radar, and initially the station functioned as a Ground-Control Intercept (GCI) and warning station.  As a GCI station, the squadron's role was to guide interceptor aircraft toward unidentified intruders picked up on the unit's radar scopes.   In 1958 the squadron was operating AN/FPS-20 and AN/FPS-6 sets.

During 1959 Grand Rapids AFS joined the Semi Automatic Ground Environment (SAGE) system, initially feeding data to DC-10 at Duluth AFS, Minnesota. After joining, the squadron was re-designated as the 707th Radar Squadron (SAGE) on 15 December 1959.  The radar squadron provided information 24/7 the SAGE Direction Center where it was analyzed to determine range, direction altitude speed and whether or not aircraft were friendly or hostile. In addition, an AN/FPS-6B height-finder radar was added that year. In 1962 the AN/FPS-20A was upgraded and redesignated as an AN/FPS-67.

In March 1963 the Air Force ordered the site to close. Operations of the 707th RS ceased on 1 August and the site was closed on 30 August.

The site was declared excess to GSA on 7 January 1964. Several parcels were conveyed to the Department of the Interior, the Grand Rapids School District # 318, and the Bureau of Mines. The 7.22 acres conveyed to the Bureau of Mines in 1967 was returned to GSA and then sold to nineteen private owners for private residences. Most of the site has been demolished to make room for new construction.

Air Force units and assignments

Units
 707th Aircraft Control and Warning Squadron
 Activated at Snelling AFS, Minnesota on 8 April 1956 (not manned or equipped)
 Moved to Grand Rapids AFS on 1 July 1956
 Redesignated as 707th Radar Squadron (SAGE) on 15 December 1959
 Discontinued and inactivated 1 August 1963

Assignments
 31st Air Division, 1 July 1956
 37th Air Division, 1 January 1959
 30th Air Division, 1 April 1959
 Duluth Air Defense Sector, 1 July 1959 – 1 August 1963

See also
 List of USAF Aerospace Defense Command General Surveillance Radar Stations

References

  Cornett, Lloyd H. and Johnson, Mildred W., A Handbook of Aerospace Defense Organization  1946 - 1980 ,  Office of History, Aerospace Defense Center, Peterson AFB, CO (1980).
 Winkler, David F. & Webster, Julie L., Searching the Skies, The Legacy of the United States Cold War Defense Radar Program,  US Army Construction Engineering Research Laboratories, Champaign, IL (1997).
 Information for Grand Rapids AFS, MN

Installations of the United States Air Force in Minnesota
Semi-Automatic Ground Environment sites
Aerospace Defense Command military installations
Military installations established in 1956
Military installations closed in 1963
1956 establishments in Minnesota
1963 disestablishments in Minnesota